Family Guy is an American animated sitcom that features five main voice actors, and numerous regular cast and recurring guest stars. The principal voice cast consists of show creator Seth MacFarlane, Alex Borstein, Mila Kunis (who replaced Lacey Chabert after the first season (her last episode is "Holy Crap," now marketed as the second episode of season two)), Seth Green, and Mike Henry. Recurring voice actors include Patrick Warburton, Adam West, John G. Brennan, Nicole Sullivan and Jennifer Tilly, and repeat guest stars include Phyllis Diller, Charles Durning, Rush Limbaugh, James Woods and Phil LaMarr.

Many cast members provide voices for multiple characters. The voice actors, in portraying the various character personalities on the show, draw inspiration from celebrities and pop culture. Family Guy characters have been played by more than one actor, after members of the show left the series or had conflicting obligations.

Kunis was nominated for an Annie Award for voicing Meg Griffin in the season 5 episode "Barely Legal" and MacFarlane has also won an Emmy Award for Outstanding Voice-Over Performance and an Annie Award for Best Voice Acting in an Animated Television Production, though no other cast member has won an award for their work on the series.

Current cast

From seasons 1 to 4, Family Guy had four main cast members. Since season 5, there have been five main cast members. The casting of Meg Griffin changed after season 1.

Seth MacFarlane
Seth MacFarlane voices four of the show's main characters: Peter Griffin, Brian Griffin, Stewie Griffin, and Glenn Quagmire. MacFarlane chose to voice these characters himself, believing it would be easier to portray the voices he had already envisioned than for someone else to attempt it. MacFarlane drew inspiration for the voice of Peter from a security guard he overheard talking while attending the Rhode Island School of Design. Stewie's voice was based on the voice of English actor Rex Harrison, especially his performance in the 1964 musical drama film My Fair Lady. The voice for Glenn Quagmire is based on 1940s and 1950s radio commercials. MacFarlane uses his own voice while portraying Brian.

MacFarlane also provides the voices for various other recurring and one-time only characters, including news anchor Tom Tucker, Lois' father Carter Pewterschmidt and Dr. Hartman.  He is the only cast member to be in every episode.

Alex Borstein
Alex Borstein voices Lois Griffin, Asian correspondent Tricia Takanawa, Loretta Brown and Lois' mother Barbara Pewterschmidt. Borstein was asked to provide a voice for the pilot while she was working on MADtv. She had not met MacFarlane or seen any of his artwork and said it was "really sight unseen". At the time, Borstein performed in a stage show in Los Angeles, in which she played a redhead mother whose voice she had based on one of her cousins. The voice was originally slower (and deeper for the original season), but when MacFarlane heard it, he replied "Make it a little less fucking annoying ... and speed it up, or every episode will last four hours."

Seth Green
Seth Green primarily plays Chris Griffin and Neil Goldman. Green stated that he did an impression of the "Buffalo Bill" character from the thriller film The Silence of the Lambs during his audition. His main inspiration for Chris' voice came from envisioning how "Buffalo Bill" would sound if he were speaking through a public address system at a McDonald's.

Mila Kunis
Mila Kunis voices Meg Griffin. Kunis won the role after the auditions and a slight rewrite of the character, in part due to her performance on That '70s Show. MacFarlane called Kunis back after her first audition, instructing her to speak slower, and then told her to come back another time and enunciate more. Once she claimed that she had it under control, MacFarlane hired her. Kunis described her character as "the scapegoat". She further explained, "Meg gets picked on a lot. But it's funny. It's like the middle child. She is constantly in the state of being an awkward 14-year-old, when you're kind of going through puberty and what-not. She's just in a perpetual mode of humiliation. And it's fun."

Mike Henry
Mike Henry is the voice of Cleveland Brown, John Herbert “The Pervert”, Bruce, Consuela, and various other characters. A Family Guy writer and producer, he began acting on the show as part of the recurring cast repertory (see below) but was promoted to main cast member in 2005. Since the cancellation of The Cleveland Show, he also voices Cleveland's step-son Rallo Tubbs on Family Guy. On June 26, 2020, after twenty years of voicing the character, Mike Henry announced on Twitter that he was stepping down from voicing Cleveland, stating "persons of color should play characters of color." On September 25, 2020, it was announced that Arif Zahir would take over as the voice of Cleveland.

Recurring cast
In addition to both its main cast and guest stars, Family Guy utilizes a deep bench of regularly appearing supporting voice actors. Some appear in nearly every episode each season, while others appear less frequently. Some of these actors specifically play recurring characters, while others mainly play background citizens of Quahog or characters in cutaway gags.

The current supporting cast repertory includes the following actors:

In addition to the above, the following actors were formerly regularly recurring voice actors in the series:

Recurring guest voices

The recurring guest voices include Adam Carolla as Death, Patrick Stewart as Susie Swanson, Scott Grimes as Kevin Swanson, Sanaa Lathan as Donna Tubbs Brown and Emily Osment as Ruth Cochamer. Previous recurring guests included Phyllis Diller in three episodes as Peter's Mother, Thelma, and Charles Durning as Peter's father, Francis. Both characters have since died, but Durning returned once to play Francis as a ghost. Early in the show's run, Fred Willard and Jane Lynch had a recurring role as a family of nudists and James Woods as himself. In 2020, it was announced that Sam Elliott would take over as Quahog's new mayor, Mayor West's estranged cousin Wyld West.

Casting changes
 Lacey Chabert voiced Meg for the first production season (14 episodes), but, because of a contractual agreement, was never credited. Chabert left the series due to time constraints with her acting role in Party of Five, as well as schoolwork.
 Jon Cryer voiced Kevin Swanson in his first appearance before the role passed to Seth MacFarlane. The character was written out of the series for several years, with Scott Grimes taking over the voice when the character returned.
 Fairuza Balk was the original voice of high school bully Connie D'Amico until Lisa Wilhoit took over the character from the third to eighteenth seasons.
 Natasha Melnick was the original voice of Meg Griffin's Friend Ruth Cochamer until Emily Osment took over the character in the eleventh season.
 Beginning in 2021-onward, Arif Zahir took over voicing Cleveland Brown from Mike Henry.

Awards and nominations

See also

References
Notes

Cast Members